Ruth Sofia Almén (24 September 1870 in Solberga rectory, Bohuslän – 19 November 1945 in Johanneberg, Gothenburg), was a Swedish composer, pianist, teacher, author and poet.

Biography 
Almén studied counterpoint with Wilhelm Stenhammar in Gothenburg, harmony with Gustaf Hägg in Stockholm, composition with Franz Neruda and Knud Jeppesen in Copenhagen, and instrumentation with Karl Westermeyer in Berlin. She also studied piano with Richard Andersson in Stockholm, Knut Bäck in Gothenburg, Heinrich Barth in Berlin, and Robert Lortat in Paris. Ruth Almén was active as a musical teacher in Gothenburg.

Musical work 
Sonata op. 1
Sonata op. 2
Violinsonat a-moll op 3
Preludium und Sarabande für Klavier op. 4
Drei Praeludien für Klavier Op. 5
Pianokonsert (Pianoconcert)

References

Further reading 
 

Swedish women writers
Swedish composers
Swedish pianists
Swedish women pianists
Swedish women poets
1870 births
1945 deaths
People from Bohuslän
Swedish women composers